John C. Calhoun is a marble sculpture depicting the American statesman of the same name by Frederick Ruckstull, installed in the United States Capitol's crypt, in Washington, D.C., as part of the National Statuary Hall Collection. The statue was gifted by the U.S. state of South Carolina in 1910.

The statue is one of three that Ruckstull has had placed in the Collection.

See also

 1910 in art

References

External links
 

1910 establishments in Washington, D.C.
1910 sculptures
John C. Calhoun
Marble sculptures in the United States
Monuments and memorials in Washington, D.C.
Calhoun, John
Sculptures of men in Washington, D.C.